Woodpeckers is a 2017 Dominican Republic drama film directed by José María Cabral. It was screened in the World Cinema Dramatic Competition section of the 2017 Sundance Film Festival. It was selected as the Dominican entry for the Best Foreign Language Film at the 90th Academy Awards, but it was not nominated. In 2017, Cabral won the Havana Star Prize for Best Director for the film at the 18th Havana Film Festival New York.

Synopsis
In adjacent male and female prisons, inmates communicate by "pecking" messages by hand. New prisoner Julian forges an alliance with the hot-tempered Manaury and learns to become a "woodpecker." Complications arise when Yanelly, Manaury's girlfriend, becomes more interested in communicating with Julian.

Cast
 Jean Jean
 Judith Rodriguez Perez
 Ramón Emilio Candelario

See also
 List of submissions to the 90th Academy Awards for Best Foreign Language Film
 List of Dominican submissions for the Academy Award for Best Foreign Language Film

References

External links
 

2017 films
2017 drama films
2010s prison drama films
Dominican Republic drama films
2010s Spanish-language films
Films set in prison